William J. Brown (born October 8, 1971) is an American basketball coach. He is the former head men's basketball coach at Albany, where he served from 2002 to 2021, guiding the Great Danes to five NCAA tournament appearances.

Playing career
Born in Miller Place, New York, Brown played collegiate basketball at Dowling College, starting for three years. He finished his career as the school's all-time leader in assists, three-point field goals and free-throw percentage, and is the only player in Dowling history to score 1,000 points and tally 500 assists.

Coaching career
Brown began his coaching career at The College of Saint Rose, serving as an assistant coach for three seasons. He then became the head coach at Sullivan County Community College, compiling a record of 90–10 in three seasons. Brown joined the coaching staff at the University at Albany as an assistant coach for the 2001–02 season, and was named interim head coach on December 20, 2001 after head coach Scott Beeten was fired. On March 13, 2002, UAlbany removed the "interim" tag from Brown's title and officially named him as its 15th head coach.

In his fourth full season on the job, Brown led the Great Danes to their first-ever America East conference regular season and tournament championship, as well as its first Division I NCAA Tournament appearance. With the help of two-time America East Player of the Year Jamar Wilson, the team won the America East conference tournament title in 2007 and returned to the NCAA tournament in 2007. 

From the 2012–13 season to the 2014–15 season, Brown guided Albany to three straight America East titles and NCAA appearances, adding his second conference regular season title in the process. His fifth conference tournament title tied Jim Calhoun for the highest total in America East history. In 2019, Brown earned his 300th career victory as the coach of the Great Danes when the team defeated Niagara.

On March 1, 2021, Brown and Albany agreed to mutually part ways at the expiration of his contract. Brown's career record at the University at Albany was 315–295.

On October 27, 2021, the Albany Patroons of The Basketball League announced that the team had hired Brown as its head coach and general manager for the 2022 season. In his only season with the Patroons, Brown guided the team to a 29–4 record as well as a The Basketball League Eastern Conference and regional conference title before stepping down from the position on December 17, 2022.

Head coaching record

Junior college

College

‡ Beeten fired 12/20/01; Brown coached rest of season.

References

External links
 Albany profile

1971 births
Living people
Albany Great Danes men's basketball coaches
American men's basketball coaches
American men's basketball players
Basketball coaches from New York (state)
Basketball players from New York (state)
College men's basketball head coaches in the United States
Dowling Golden Lions men's basketball players
Junior college men's basketball coaches in the United States
Point guards
People from Miller Place, New York
Saint Rose Golden Knights men's basketball coaches
Albany Patroons coaches